Rocky Mountain Christmas is the tenth studio album and first Christmas album by American singer-songwriter John Denver, released in October 1975 by RCA Victor Records.

His first Christmas-themed release, the album includes renditions of several traditional carols and popular Christmas standards; re-recorded versions of two songs from earlier Denver albums, "Aspenglow" from Take Me to Tomorrow and "Please, Daddy (Don't Get Drunk This Christmas)" from Farewell Andromeda; and the newly penned compositions "Christmas for Cowboys" and "A Baby Just Like You"; these two songs along with five others including Aspenglow were featured in Denver's TV special of the same name that aired December 10, 1975.

The single from the album, "Christmas for Cowboys", became a minor hit in the US (#58 pop) and Canada (#77 pop, No. 26 AC).

Track listing

Notes
 signifies arranged and adapted by
 signifies adapted by

Personnel
 John Denver – vocals and 12-string guitars
 Dick Kniss – bass
 Lee Holdridge – piano, celeste, harpsichord and tack piano
 Steve Weisberg – guitar
 John Sommers – guitar and mandolin
 Hal Blaine – drums and percussion
 Herbie Lovelle – drums
 George Marge – oboe and English horn on "Silver Bells"
 Harvey Estrin – flute on "Silver Bells"
 Sid Sharp – violin
 William Kurasch – violin
 Samuel Boghossian – viola
 Jesse Erhlich – cello
 Pearl Kaufman – piano and harpsichord play on "Coventry Carol," "What Child Is This," and "Oh Holy Night"
 Chuck Collazzi – plays guitar on "What Child Is This"
Technical
Kris O'Connor – assistant producer
Mickey Crofford – engineer
Acy Lehman – art direction
Peter Palombi – illustration

Charts

References

1975 Christmas albums
Christmas albums by American artists
John Denver albums
Albums produced by Milt Okun
Albums arranged by Lee Holdridge
RCA Records Christmas albums
Folk Christmas albums
Pop Christmas albums